Sweden competed at the 1992 Summer Paralympics in Barcelona and Madrid, Spain. Competitors from Sweden won 68 medals including 16 gold, 33 silver and 19 bronze and finished 18th in the medal table.

See also 
 Sweden at the Paralympics
 Sweden at the 1992 Summer Olympics

References 

Nations at the 1992 Summer Paralympics
1992
Summer Paralympics